KSEW (950 AM) was a radio station licensed to serve Seward, Alaska.  The station is owned by Seward Media Partners, LLC.  It aired an adult contemporary music format.

The station has been assigned these call letters by the Federal Communications Commission since May 14, 2008.

Under a previous owner, the station simulcasted with KYSC in Fairbanks for several years.

KSEW's license expired on February 1, 2014, after the application for renewal of the station's license was not filed on time. In addition it had not paid FCC fees for a number of years and efforts to collect the debt were unsuccessful.

The call letters appear in the FCC database as D(deleted)KSEW.

References

External links

SEW
Radio stations established in 1948
1948 establishments in Alaska
Defunct radio stations in the United States
Radio stations disestablished in 2014
2014 disestablishments in Alaska
SEW